RNA-binding protein with multiple splicing is a protein that in humans is encoded by the RBPMS gene.

Function 

This gene encodes a member of the RRM family of RNA-binding proteins. The RRM domain is between 80-100 amino acids in length and family members contain one to four copies of the domain. The RRM domain consists of two short stretches of conserved sequence called RNP1 and RNP2, as well as a few highly conserved hydrophobic residues. The protein encoded by this gene has a single, putative RRM domain in its N-terminus. Alternative splicing results in multiple transcript variants encoding different isoforms.

It is uniquely expressed in retinal ganglion cells in the mammalian retina, for reasons unknown.

Interactions 

RBPMS has been shown to interact with SMUG1.

References

Further reading